"Arctica" is a song of Finnish symphonic power metal band Amberian Dawn's third studio album End of Eden, and the first single from the album. The song was released for free download on MySpace on August 23, 2010, and a music video produced for the song was released on October 20 through YouTube. Heidi Parviainen, Amberian Dawn's lead singer, has called Arctica her favorite Amberian Dawn song.

Music video 

A music video was shot for the song in 2010, Amberian Dawn's fourth after River of Tuoni, My Only Star and He Sleeps in a Grove. The video was produced by Routafilmi and directed by Markus Nieminen, and released on October 20, 2010, through YouTube, at the same date of the End of Eden album release. The video varies between shots of the band playing against a red background, and scenes of an old alchemist with a magic amulet. By the end of the video, the alchemist manages to freeze the amulet to ice, and the band's background becomes white and icy.

Reception 
"Arctica" was generally received as a good successor to the band's previous lead songs such as "River of Tuoni" and "He Sleeps in a Grove", but was also heavily criticised for repetition. HeavyLaw says, "the first single, "Arctica" is in this sense an index along the lines of self-plagiarism. Woefully predictable, it does not make enough justice to the talent of the group." Metal Sickness called it extremely catchy and one of their darkest songs yet, alongside "Talisman" portraying a more mature side of the band.

References

2010 singles
Amberian Dawn songs
2010 songs
Spinefarm Records singles
Songs written by Tuomas Seppälä